Mount Agassiz may refer to:

 Mount Agassiz (California) in California, U.S.
 Mount Agassiz (Utah) in Utah, U.S.

See also
 Agassiz (disambiguation)#Landforms